Dananja Madushanka is a Sri Lankan cricketer. He made his List A debut for Polonnaruwa District in the 2016–17 Districts One Day Tournament on 18 March 2017.

References

External links
 

Year of birth missing (living people)
Living people
Sri Lankan cricketers
Polonnaruwa District cricketers
Place of birth missing (living people)